Rushen Jones is a former professional American football player who played defensive back for the Minnesota Vikings

References

1980 births
American football safeties
Vanderbilt Commodores football players
Minnesota Vikings players
Living people
People from Lake Forest, Illinois